House of Gold (released as Family Runs on DVD) is a 2013 Ghanaian Nigerian comedy film, produced by Yvonne Nelson and directed by Pascal Amanfo. It stars Majid Michel, Yvonne Nelson, Omawumi Megbele, Mercy Chinwo, Ice Prince Zamani, Eddie Watson and Francis Odega.

The film narrates the story of a business mogul and a socialite, Dan Ansah Williams who is dying of cancer and has been told that he has six weeks left to live. He makes a decision with the help of his attorney to call all his children back home, most of whom were born out of wedlock and various illicit affairs. The re-union spins a lot of surprises as each child returns with an agenda, which gives hilarious results.

It was released on 12 April 2013 in Ghana and on 19 July 2013 in Nigeria. Though the film was met with generally negative critical reviews, it received nominations at the 2013 Golden Icons Academy Movie Awards, 2013 Ghana Movie Awards, 2014 Africa Magic Viewers Choice Awards and 2013 Zulu African Film Academy Awards. It won six awards at the latter, including categories: "Best Picture", "Best Director", "Best Supporting Actor", "Best Supporting Actress" and "Best Cinematography".

Cast
Majid Michel as Freddie Dan Ansah
Yvonne Nelson as Timara Dan Ansah
Omawumi Megbele as Nina Dan Ansah
Umar Krupp as Peter Dan Ansah
Eddie Watson as Sam
Francis Odega as John Bosco
Luckie Lawson as Mitchel Dan Ansah
Amanorbea Dodoo as Barrister Paula
Mercy Chinwo as Lucia
Ice Prince Zamani as Tony
Dream Debo as Judas
Marlon Mave as Jamal Dan Ansah
Emefal Atse as Jasmine
Pascal Amanfo as Clifford Dan Ansah

 trailer of House of Gold was released on YouTube on 4 March 2013. The film was premiered in Ghana on 12 April 2013 and in Nigeria on 19 July 2013, before going on a general theatrical release in Nigeria. It was released on DVD with the title Family Runs in November 2013 by Henrikesim Multimedia Concept.

Reception

Box office
House of Gold grossed a total of ₦15,454,401 in Nigerian cinemas, peaking at number 3 on the Box Office chart, at the time of its release, .

Critical reception
The film was generally met with negative reviews. Nollywood Reinvented rated the film 28%, stating that the narrative "takes some getting used to" and concluded: "House of Gold is ‘nothing spectacular’, but it is ‘nothing spectacular’ dressed in pretty clothes and filled with many comic moments". Sodas and Popcorn comments: "House of Gold began with great potential but somehow ended up going last-flight-to-abuja on us all and just crashes shortly after takeoff". It gave the film 2 out of 5 and concluded by stating: "addicts would have had a great time watching this movie, which admittedly was indeed funny. But then, it is what it is; A badly written funny movie. If you are a big fan of a GOOD movie and you were attracted to this movie by the awesome title and lovely poster, then move along. Nothing here for you". Wilfred Okiche of YNaija panned the film, stating that "The plot is repetitive, scripting is wishy washy, characters come and go in a disastrous blur and nothing here is particularly memorable, not even in a bad way". He however commended Francis Odega's performance, but concluded: "Yvonne Nelson and Majid Michel cannot save this House of Gold from sinking". Ameyaw Debrah of Africa Magic gave a mixed review and concluded: "House Of Gold has a lot of good laugh-out-loud moments which make up for the not too impressive acting and fickle storyline. Not a collector’s item but a good movie to see with the family or with friends".  Efe Doghudje of 360Nobs gave 3.5 out of 10 stars and concluded: "Family Runs [House of Gold] was a miscue in terms of production quality, post production and scripting, which is very unlike the team that put Single and Married together". Ada Arinze of Connect Nigeria comments: "The movie starts out well, with lots of laughs, but spirals down into a boring and predictable ending".

Accolades
The film received eight nominations at the 2013 Golden Icons Academy Movie Awards, eleven at the 2013 Ghana Movie Awards, a nomination at the 2014 Africa Magic Viewers Choice Awards and another eleven nominations at the 2013 Zulu African Film Academy Awards. It won six awards at the latter, including categories: "Best Picture", "Best Director", "Best Supporting Actor" for Francis Odega, "Best Supporting Actress" for Omawumi Megbele, "Best Use of Costume" and "Best Cinematography".

See also
 List of Nigerian films of 2013

References

External links

Nigerian comedy-drama films
2013 comedy-drama films
Nigerian multilingual films
Ghanaian comedy-drama films
2010s French-language films
2013 multilingual films
2013 films